Twine is a light string or strong thread composed of two or more smaller strands or yarns twisted together. 

Twine may also refer to:

Twine (band), an American electronic music duo
Twine (device), a configurable device with sensors that can connect to a network
Twine (marketplace), a marketplace that connects companies to creative professionals
Twine (social network), a social networking and data storage site
Twine (software), software for authoring HTML-based interactive fiction
Derek Twine (born 1951), British scouting executive
France Winddance Twine, Native American sociologist, ethnographer, visual artist
The World Is Not Enough, a 1999 James Bond film
The World Is Not Enough (Nintendo 64 video game), a 2000 Nintendo 64 video game based on the film
The World Is Not Enough (PlayStation video game), a 2000 PlayStation video game based on the film
The World Is Not Enough (2001 video game), a 2001 Game Boy Color video game based on the film

See also

Toine